The Araguainha crater or Araguainha dome is an impact crater on the border of Mato Grosso and Goiás states, Brazil, between the villages of Araguainha and Ponte Branca.

The crater has most recently been dated to  years ago, when the region was probably a shallow sea. The margins of error of this date overlap the time of the Permian–Triassic extinction event, one of the largest mass extinction events in Earth's history. The impact punched through Paleozoic sedimentary units belonging to the Paraná Basin formations, and exposed the underlying Ordovician granite basement rocks.

Description 

Araguainha is a complex crater with annular and radial faults, exposed to the surface and eroded, cut through by the Araguaia River. The crater has an uplifted central core, shaped like an elliptical basin, consisting of exposed basement granite. This central region is surrounded by an annular depression floored by rocks from Devonian and Carboniferous sandstone formations. The outer rim of the crater consists of remnants of semi-circular grabens in highly deformed Permo-Carboniferous sediments. Evidences of impact origin include shatter cones, impact breccias, and shocked quartz.

Access and conservation 
The Araguainha Dome can be reached by car from Goiânia or from Cuiabá. The unpaved state road MT-306, between Ponte Branca and Araguainha, cuts across the central uplift, as does the Araguaia River. As of 1999, the local residents were not yet aware of the dome's nature and scientific importance.

Dating and interpretation 
The earliest report on the Araguainha structure was published by Northfleet et al. (1969), who interpreted it as an uplift of the Phanerozoic sediments caused by a Cretaceous syenite intrusion. A geological reconnaissance survey by Silveira Filho and Ribeiro (1971) noted the occurrence of lavas, breccias, and tuffs around the central core and deduced that Araguainha was a crypto-volcanic structure. Dietz and French (1973) reported the occurrence of impact breccias and shocked quartz, and recognized the structure as an impact crater. A detailed study of the crater by Crósta et al. (1981) and Crósta (1982) reported further petrological and mineralogical evidence of the impact. Further geomorphologic evidence was published by Theilen-Willige (1981). A magnetic survey was conducted by Fischer and Masero (1994).

Dome formation was first dated (at  years ago, with Rb-Sr method) by Deutsch et al. (1992). Engelhardt et al. (1992) published a detailed study of the uplifted core and a revised date of about 246 million years ago, later revised to about 244 million years ago. Most recently it was dated by Tohver et al. (2012) at  years ago.

Effects 
Recent dating by Tohver et al. (2012), to  years ago, places the impact at dates overlapping estimates for the Permo-Triassic boundary. and the Permian–Triassic extinction event.

Much of the local rock was oil shale. The estimated energy released by the Araguainha impact is insufficient to be a direct cause of the global mass extinction, but the colossal local earth rifting would have released huge amounts of oil and gas from the shattered rock. The resulting sudden global warming might have precipitated the Permian–Triassic extinction.

References

External links 
 
 
 

Impact craters of Brazil
Permian impact craters
Permian–Triassic extinction event
Landforms of Mato Grosso
Landforms of Goiás
Geology of Brazil
First 100 IUGS Geological Heritage Sites